The Cape Verdean Women's National Championship is the top flight of women's association football in Cape Verde. The competition is run by the Cape Verdean Football Federation.

History
The first Cape Verdean women's regional championships started on 2003. The first national championship on 2011.

Champions
The list of champions and runners-up:

Most successful clubs

References

External links 
 Campeonato Nacional Feminino - fcf.cv

Women's association football leagues in Africa
Football competitions in Cape Verde
Women
2010 establishments in Cape Verde
Sports leagues established in 2010
Women's sport in Cape Verde